Sirpa Ylönen (born on 15 June 1957 in Mikkeli) is a Finnish sport shooter. She competed in rifle shooting events at the 1984 Summer Olympics and the 1988 Summer Olympics.

Olympic results

References

1957 births
Living people
ISSF rifle shooters
Finnish female sport shooters
Shooters at the 1984 Summer Olympics
Shooters at the 1988 Summer Olympics
Olympic shooters of Finland
People from Mikkeli
Sportspeople from South Savo